was a city located in Niigata Prefecture, Japan. The city was founded on June 1, 1954.

As of 2003, the city had an estimated population of 23,855 and the density of 116.41 persons per km². The total area was 204.92 km².

On January 1, 2006, Tochio, along with the towns of Teradomari and Yoita, and the village of Washima (all from Santō District), was merged into the expanded city of Nagaoka.

Transportation

Railway
Echigo Kotsu Tochio Line(:ja:越後交通栃尾線) had been operated in the city until 1973.

Highway

See also

Dissolved municipalities of Niigata Prefecture
Nagaoka, Niigata